Fernando Zamora (born February 14, 1979) is a Mexican-American writer.

Biography 
Born in Mexico City, 14 February 1979, he is a novelist and screenwriter. His work addresses sexual diversity. Those under the water tells the secret love and friendship between Paul Aguirre (a Mexican General during the Mexican Revolution) and Hugo Estrada. This relationship will lead them both to destruction. In his second novel, Suite of love and death, he uses diverse points of view to tell the story of the love of a piano teacher for his dear student Cristobal.

References

Mexican screenwriters
Mexican novelists
Mexican male writers
Male novelists
Living people
1979 births
Mexican emigrants to the United States
Writers from Mexico City